Wangchuk Namgyel (born ) is a Bhutanese educationist and politician who is the current Speaker of the National Assembly of Bhutan, in office since November 2018. He has been a member of the National Assembly of Bhutan, since October 2018.

Early life and education

He graduated from the University of Madras, India and received a degree of Master of Arts in History. He also has a Post Graduate Diploma in Education from National Institute of Education, Samtse.

Career

Professional career
Namgyel started his professional career 27 years ago. He was a former headmaster of four high schools and also served as the chief of school monitoring in the education ministry.

Political career
Namgyel is a member of Druk Nyamrup Tshogpa (DNT). He was elected to the National Assembly of Bhutan as a candidate of DNT from Nyishog-Saephu constituency in the 2018 Bhutanese National Assembly election. He received 4,388 votes and defeated Chimmi Jamtsho, a candidate of DPT.

On 30 October 2018, he was nominated by DNT for the office of the Speaker of the National Assembly of Bhutan. On 31 October 2018, he was elected as the Speaker of the National Assembly of Bhutan. He received 30 votes against 17 votes of Ugyen Wangdi.

References 

1964 births
Living people
Bhutanese MNAs 2018–2023
Bhutanese educators
Druk Nyamrup Tshogpa politicians
Speakers of the National Assembly (Bhutan)
University of Madras alumni
Druk Nyamrup Tshogpa MNAs